Alexander Norén (born 12 July 1982) is a Swedish professional golfer who currently plays on the PGA Tour and the European Tour. He has won ten tournaments on the European Tour, including the BMW PGA Championship, the Aberdeen Asset Management Scottish Open, the British Masters, HNA Open de France and the Nedbank Golf Challenge. He was a member of the winning 2018 European Ryder Cup team.

Early life 
Norén was born in Stockholm, first tried golf at 4 years of age and started playing at Haninge Golf Club. Practicing other sports too, he finally chose to give his priority to golf.

As a 14 year old, he won the unofficial Swedish Youth Championship, Föreningsbanken Cup, at his age level, scoring 146 over 36 holes at Rya Golf Club.

15 years of age, he attended the Swedish upper secondary sports school, to combine studying with golf training. He was also employed as junior editor at Svensk Golf, the official magazine of the Swedish Golf Federation.

Amateur career 
He  represented Sweden as an amateur on all levels. He was part of the Swedish team winning the 2002 European Youths' Team Championship at Gdansk G&CC, Poland. He also represented Sweden at the 2004 Eisenhower Trophy in Río Grande, Puerto Rico, were the Swedish team finished as bronze-medalists and Norén tied 3rd individually.

He attended Oklahoma State University in the United States.

Professional career 
Norén turned professional at the end of 2005 and gained a place on Europe's second tier Challenge Tour by reaching the final stage of the European Tour qualifying school. In his rookie season he claimed his maiden professional victory at the Rolex Trophy, and ended the year in 3rd place on the Challenge Tour Rankings to graduate to the elite European Tour for 2007.

Norén had a solid rookie season on the European Tour in 2007 and improved on that the following year to finish in 31st place on the Order of Merit. He made the cut at the 2008 Open Championship and was in the top 10 going into day 3, before eventually finishing in a tie for 19th place.

Norén won his first title on the European Tour in September 2009 at the Omega European Masters, where he finished 20 under par to win by two strokes over Bradley Dredge. Norén finished the season ranked 25th on the Race To Dubai.

2011–2014
In June 2011, Norén won his second European Tour title at the Saab Wales Open played at The Celtic Manor Resort. He won by two strokes from Grégory Bourdy and Anders Hansen finishing at 9 under par. This victory secured him of a place in the WGC-Bridgestone Invitational at Firestone Country Club in August. The following month, Norén won his third European Tour title at the Nordea Masters at Bro Hof Slott Golf Club in his home country of Sweden. He won from wire-to-wire, the first time in his career he had achieved this feat, and opened up an eleven-stroke margin after the third round. Despite difficult conditions in the wind on the final day, Norén finished seven strokes ahead of Richard Finch. He finished the season ranked 14th on the Race to Dubai.

After two positive seasons in 2012 and 2013, where he registered third places at the Aberdeen Asset Management Scottish Open and the Alfred Dunhill Links Championship, Norén missed most of 2014 with tendonitis in both wrists.

2015–2016
Norén came back to competitions in January 2015; in June he won his fourth European Tour title by capturing the Nordea Masters in Sweden for the second time in his career. He won by four strokes from Søren Kjeldsen, having held a two-stroke lead after 54 holes.

In the second half of 2016 Norén would hit outstanding form, winning four in eleven starts on the European Tour. In July he won the Aberdeen Asset Management Scottish Open at Castle Stuart, the event before The Open Championship, for his fifth European Tour victory. He won by a single stroke from the Englishman Tyrrell Hatton. This win continued his trend of holding the 54-hole lead in every event that he had won on tour. It also represented the first time that Norén had won in back-to-back seasons.

After finishing runner-up at the Paul Lawrie Matchplay in August, he won the Omega European Masters in September, beating Scott Hend at the first playoff hole. A month later, he captured his third win of the season at the British Masters at The Grove. The win lifted him to the 18th place on the Official World Golf Ranking.

In November, Norén won his fourth title of 2016 at the Nedbank Golf Challenge, capturing $1,166,660, the largest in his career so far. He began the final day six shots behind Wang Jeung-hun only to finish six strokes ahead after a record round of 63 (−9). With the win, he moved to third in the Race to Dubai ranking, and to ninth in the Official World Golf Ranking, becoming only the fourth Swede to enter the top ten of the OWGR after Henrik Stenson, Robert Karlsson and Jesper Parnevik.

In March 2017, Norén was awarded 2016 Best Athlete in Stockholm by the Stockholm Sports Federation and the Stockholm Sport Journalists Club.

2017–2018
In May 2017, Norén won the BMW PGA Championship on the European Tour.

Norén qualified for the PGA Tour for the 2017–18 season through non-member FedEx Cup points. In January 2018, Norén finished runner-up at the Farmers Insurance Open after entering the final round with a one stroke lead. Norén lost to Jason Day on the sixth extra hole of a sudden-death playoff. The players had to come back for a Monday finish, after the first five holes could not separate them. Norén then lost to birdie on the sixth extra hole, after his second shot found the water.

In March 2018, Norén had another notable week, when he finished 3rd place in the WGC-Match Play. He progressed all the way through to the semi-finals, where he faced Kevin Kisner. It was a tight match all the way through, with no player more than 1 up. Norén had a putt to win the match on the 18th hole, but it slid by. He would eventually lose in 19 holes, after a misread putt from off the green cost him a bogey. He then beat Justin Thomas, 5 & 3, in the consolation match.

In July 2018, Norén won the HNA Open de France on the European Tour. This event was held at Le Golf National outside of Paris, France.

In September 2018, Norén qualified for the European team participating in the 2018 Ryder Cup. Europe defeated the U.S. team 17 1/2 to 10 1/2. Coincidentally, the event was also held at Le Golf National. Noren went 2–1–0 and won his singles match against Bryson DeChambeau, playing in the last game on Sunday. Norén secured his win when he holed a long birdie putt on the 18th hole, the very last shot of the whole event, stating the final result and causing the European team to celebrate on the 18th green.

2019–2022
Norén could not maintain his good form through 2019 and fell in the Official World Golf Ranking from 19th at the end of 2018 to 75th a year later. His best 2019 finish on the European Tour as well as on the PGA Tour was tied 11th at the 148th Open Championship at Royal Portrush Golf Club, Northern Ireland.

On 26 July 2020, Norén had his best PGA Tour finish in over two years, when he tied 3rd at the 3M Open in Blaine, Minnesota, with a 268, (−16) score, three shots behind winner Michael Thompson.

At the 120th U.S. Open on 17−20 September 2020 at Winged Foot Golf Club, New York, Norén made the cut at 6 over par with no margin. In the third round, under tough conditions, he shot a 3-under 67, the second lowest round of the day, advancing to 11th place. He finished the tournament a career best tied 17th at 8 over par, 14 strokes behind winner Bryson DeChambeau, but only six strokes from third place.

At the 2021 Rocket Mortgage Classic at Detroit  Golf Club, Detroit, Michigan, on July 4, Norén shot an 8-under-par score of 64 in the fourth round, to finish tied fourth, one shot from reaching a playoff for the win. By this achievement, he advanced to 83rd on the Official World Golf Ranking, his best ranking since January 2020.

In July 2022, Norén was the first alternate at the 150th Open Championship, having been onsite until Tuesday, he decided to fly to California to play in the Barracuda Championship. He went on to finish solo-second; finishing one point behind Chez Reavie.

In November 2022, Norén finished tied second at the DP World Tour Championship in Dubai, advancing to 41st on the Official World Golf Ranking and giving him an opportunity to stay inside the top 50 on the world rankings at the end of the year and to receive an invitation to the 2023 Masters Tournament.

Professional wins (11)

European Tour wins (10)

1Co-sanctioned by the Asian Tour
 The BMW PGA Championship is also a Rolex Series tournament.

European Tour playoff record (1–0)

Challenge Tour wins (1)

Challenge Tour playoff record (0–1)

Playoff record
PGA Tour playoff record (0–1)

Results in major championships
Results not in chronological order in 2020.

CUT = missed the half-way cut
WD = withdrew
"T" = tied
NT = No tournament due to COVID-19 pandemic

Summary

Most consecutive cuts made – 4 (2019 Open - 2021 PGA)
Longest streak of top-10s – 1 (twice)

Results in The Players Championship

CUT = missed the halfway cut
"T" indicates a tie for a place
C = Cancelled after the first round due to the COVID-19 pandemic

Results in World Golf Championships
Results not in chronological order prior to 2015.

1Cancelled due to COVID-19 pandemic

QF, R16, R32, R64 = Round in which player lost in match play
NT = No tournament
"T" = tied
Note that the Championship and Invitational were discontinued from 2022.

Team appearances
Amateur
European Boys' Team Championship (representing Sweden): 1998, 1999, 2000
Jacques Léglise Trophy (representing the Continent of Europe): 2000
European Youths' Team Championship (representing Sweden): 2002 (winners)
European Amateur Team Championship (representing Sweden): 2003, 2005
Eisenhower Trophy (representing Sweden): 2004
Palmer Cup (representing Europe): 2004 (winners), 2005

Professional
Royal Trophy (representing Europe): 2010 (winners)
Seve Trophy (representing Continental Europe): 2011
World Cup (representing Sweden): 2011, 2016
EurAsia Cup (representing Europe): 2018 (winners)
Ryder Cup (representing Europe): 2018 (winners)
Hero Cup (representing Continental Europe): 2023 (winners)

See also
List of golfers with most European Tour wins
2006 Challenge Tour graduates

References

External links

Swedish male golfers
European Tour golfers
Ryder Cup competitors for Europe
Olympic golfers of Sweden
Golfers at the 2020 Summer Olympics
Oklahoma State Cowboys golfers
Swedish expatriates in Monaco
Golfers from Stockholm
People from Monte Carlo
1982 births
Living people